Power Rangers Dino Force Brave is a 2017 South Korean tokusatsu television show produced by Daewon Media, the same company which distributes the Super Sentai Series in South Korea under the "Power Rangers" label despite being unrelated to Saban Brands. It serves as a sequel to the 2013 Super Sentai Series, Zyuden Sentai Kyoryuger. Toei Company, the owner of the Super Sentai franchise, collaborated in the filming. Kyoryuger director Koichi Sakamoto returned to direct the series. The show began its broadcast in South Korea on April 1 with two episodes a week for the first two weeks before moving to one episode a week starting April 15. The majority of the main cast is composed of K-pop artists.

The show was dubbed into Japanese by Toei under the label . The Japanese dub version was streamed on Bandai's official YouTube channel, as well as through the Toei Tokusatsu Fanclub in Japan starting on April 14.

Story

Peace returns to Earth after the Power Rangers Dino Force (Kyoryugers) destroyed the Deboth Army, but a new enemy known as the Neo Deboth Army emerges to seek out revenge against the Earth Power Dinos (Zyudenryu) while obtaining "the Power of Dragon King" to conquer the planet. Sensing their presence, yet unable to fight them due to his Spirit state, Torin saves Canderrilla and Luckyulo from being sealed with Bragigas as the three recruit a "People of the Strong Dragons" to combat the new threat.

Episodes
Individual episodes are known as "Kings".

Cast
Korean cast
Kim Se-yong (Myname) as Kwon Juyong
Hong Sung-ho (Apeace) as Jeon Hyeonjun
Oh Se-hyeon (Apeace) as Kim Sechang
Injun (DGNA) as Lee Pureun
Lee Yu-jin (Fave Girls) as Yoon Dohee
Lee Se-young (Cross Gene) as Juhyeok
Song Joon-seok as Torin (Voice)
Kim Do-young as Canderrilla (Voice)
Chae Min-ji as Luckyuro (Voice)
Min Eung-shik as Deizarus (Voice)
Lee Hyun as Raimein (Voice)
Lee Jang-won as Homuras (Voice)
Kim Tae-hoon as Wahab (Voice)
Hwang Chang-yeong as Tsuraira (Voice) and Jo Haneul (Voice)
Yi Ki-sung as Arash (Voice)
Kim Min-joo as Jinarik (Voice)
Jang Mi as Shark Ranger (Voice)
Kwon Chang-wook as Lion Ranger (Voice)
Jeong Ju-won as Elephant Ranger (Voice)
Seo Yu-ri as Tiger Ranger (Voice)
Yoo Hae-moo as Narration, Brave Dino Force Ranger Equipment Voice

Japanese cast
 as Jo Haneul ( in Zyuden Sentai Kyoryuger Brave)

Japanese dub voice actors
: 
: 
: 
: 
: 
 
: 
: 
: 
: 
: 
: 
: 
: 
: 
: 
: 
: 
: 
: 
Narration, Kyoryuger Equipment Voice:

Songs
Opening theme
"Dino Force Brave"
Lyrics: Yeo Hee
Composition: 
Arrangement:  (Project.R)
Artist: Brave Red Dino (Kim Se-yong)
Episodes 2/9, 3/7, 4/10, and 5/8/11 use version performed by Brave Blue Dino (Oh Se-hyeon), Brave Black Dino (Hong Sung-ho), Brave Green Dino (Injun), and Brave Gold Dino (Lee Se-young) respectively.

Ending theme
"Dino Dance!"/
Lyrics: Yeo Hee
Lyrics (Japanese Translation): Nozomi Inoue
Composition: 
Arrangement:  (Project.R)
Artist: Yeo Hee (Project.R)

References

External links
Official website at Toei Company 

Super Sentai
2017 South Korean television series debuts
2017 South Korean television series endings